7092 Cadmus, provisional designation , is a highly eccentric asteroid and near-Earth object of the Apollo group, approximately 3 kilometers in diameter. It was discovered on 4 June 1992, by American astronomer couple Carolyn and Eugene Shoemaker at Palomar Observatory in California, United States. The asteroid was named after Cadmus from Greek mythology.

Orbit and classification 

Cadmus orbits the Sun in the central main-belt at a distance of 0.8–4.3 AU once every 4.04 years (1,474 days). Its orbit has an eccentricity of 0.70 and an inclination of 18° with respect to the ecliptic. It is a member of the Alinda group of asteroids with a 3:1 resonance with Jupiter that has excited the eccentricity of the orbit over the eons.

Due to a precovery obtained at the Australian Siding Spring Observatory, the body's observation arc already begins in 1980.

Physical characteristics 

As of 2016, the asteroid's effective size, its composition and albedo, as well as its rotation period and shape remain unknown. Based on an absolute magnitude of 15.1, it measures between 3 and 6 kilometers in diameter, assuming an albedo in the range of 0.05 to 0.25. Since near-Earth asteroids are often of a silicaceous rather than of a carbonaceous composition, with higher albedos, typically above 0.20, the asteroid's diameter might be on the lower end of NASA's published conversion table, as the higher the body's reflectivity (albedo), the smaller its diameter, at a constant absolute magnitude (brightness).

Naming 

This minor planet is named for Cadmus, the Phoenician prince, first king of Theben, and one of the greatest heroes before the days of Heracles. The minor planets 1873 Agenor, 52 Europa, 5731 Zeus, 881 Athene, 40 Harmonia and 1388 Aphrodite are named after related figures from Greek mythology.

References

External links 
 Asteroid Lightcurve Database (LCDB), query form (info )
 Dictionary of Minor Planet Names, Google books
 Asteroids and comets rotation curves, CdR – Observatoire de Genève, Raoul Behrend
 
 
 

007092
007092
Discoveries by Carolyn S. Shoemaker
Discoveries by Eugene Merle Shoemaker
Named minor planets
19920604